Mind Blowin' is the second studio album by American rapper Vanilla Ice. Released on March 22, 1994, it is the rapper's final release on SBK Records. The album did not chart, and received unfavorable reviews. It has since received some degree of cult status in the hip hop community. Songs from the album made up one third of Vanilla Ice's tours during 1992–2010. The album shifted just 42,000 copies in the United States, a massive drop in comparison to his blockbuster debut album To the Extreme. Despite this, lead single Roll 'Em Up received some airplay in Europe.

Ice followed up this album with 1998's Hard to Swallow, which involved a switch to the record label Republic Records.

Lyrics 
Cyco of Insane Poetry worked on 10 songs on the album.

The Wrath, one of the album's singles, was a reply to the single "Pop Goes the Weasel" by 3rd Bass.

Mark Wahlberg, then in the rap group Marky Mark and the Funky Bunch, had made negative remarks about Ice in one of his songs. Ice answered back in the song Hit 'em Hard which was mostly a diss track aimed at Mark, but Ice also included 3rd Bass and MC Hammer. Neither 3rd Bass nor Marky Mark and the Funky Bunch responded.

A lot of the lyrics were drug influenced and featured references to smoking marijuana, especially in the single Roll 'em Up. The song I Go Down pays tribute to Gang Starr, Mary J. Blige and Tupac Shakur.

Reception 

Reviews were unfavorable. Entertainment Weekly reviewer James Bernard called the album "more clunky than funky". Rolling Stone reviewer Danyel Smith called the song "Get Loose" "snappy", writing that although the lyrics are "inane", "the song is a thumping party, one of the few places where Ice loosens up. He sounds solid at the beginning of 'The Wrath' as well [...] He sounds easy and unaffected – close to sexy. But he doesn't keep it up: In 'Now and Forever,' a wet dream kind of song, Ice goes back to goofy lyrics [...] and his dry Max Headroom style." AllMusic reviewer Stephen Thomas Erlewine wrote that "There isn't a single moment that establishes a distinct musical identity, and the whole thing is rather embarrassing."

The album was named the "Least Essential Album Showcasing An Image Makeover" in The A.V. Club's list of the "Least Essential Albums of the '90s," cited as "an album that inspired almost no one to roll up the hootie mack, as instructed in its first single."

Track listing

Samples

Fame
"Long Red" by Mountain
"Synthetic Substitution" by Melvin Bliss
"Voodoo Child (Slight Return)" by Jimi Hendrix
"Fame" by David Bowie
The Wrath
"Wicked World" by Black Sabbath
"When Boys Talk" by Indeep
Roll 'Em Up
"It's a New Day" by Skull Snaps
"Insane In The Brain" by Cypress Hill
Hit Em Hard
"Impeach the President" by The Honey Drippers
Smooth Interlude
"Do It Roger" by Roger
Now & Forever
"Don't Change Your Love" by Five Stairsteps
"Motor Booty Affair" by Parliament
"Do It Roger" by Roger
Iceman Party
"Do You Wanna Go Party" by KC & the Sunshine Band
"I Heard It Through the Grapevine" by Roger
Oh My Gosh
"Say It Loud, I'm Black and I'm Proud" by James Brown
"It's a New Day" by Skull Snaps
Minutes of Power
"Cold Sweat" by James Brown
"Take Me to the Next Phase" by The Isley Brothers
"Opening/Can You Feel It" by The Jacksons
"Cutie Pie" by One Way
I Go Down
"Impeach the President" by The Honey Drippers
"You're Just What I Need" by Betty Wright
Phunky Rhymes
"Doo Wa Ditty (Blow That Thing)" by Zapp
"Son of Reach for It (The Funky Dream)" by George Duke
Blowin My Mind
"Sara Smile" by Hall & Oates
"Mind Blowing Decisions" by Heatwave
Get Loose
"More Bounce to the Ounce" by Zapp
"We Call It the Box" by Bill Summers

Personnel

Musicians 
 Vanilla Ice — vocals, producer, engineer, executive producer, mixing
 Darryl "Delite" Allamby — keyboards
 Davis Bickston — drums
 Mike Daane — bass
 Dee Dee Harris — vocals
 Paul Loomis — keyboards
 Jeffrey Smith — electronic sounds, talk box
 Andy Timmons — guitar
 Robert Wechsler — guitar, programming, engineer, synclavier
 Steve Williams — drums

Additional personnel 
 Scott Burnworth — art direction, design, photography
 Tom Coyne — mastering
 Dave Gossett — A&R
 Glen Hardy — photography
 Sean Hargraves — type
 Phil Johnson — art direction, design
 Scott Johnson — art direction, design
 James Conrad Koch — logo
 Tha Hit Men — producer
 Zero — producer, mixing

References 

1994 albums
Vanilla Ice albums
Cannabis music